Computer Vision Annotation Tool (CVAT) is a free, open source, web-based image and video annotation tool which is used for labeling data for computer vision algorithms. Originally developed by Intel, CVAT is designed for use by a professional data annotation team, with a user interface optimized for computer vision annotation tasks.

CVAT supports the primary tasks of supervised machine learning: object detection, image classification, and image segmentation. CVAT allows users to annotate data for each of these cases.

CVAT has many powerful features, including interpolation of shapes between key frames, semi-automatic annotation using deep learning models, shortcuts for most critical actions, a dashboard with a list of annotation projects and tasks, LDAP and basic access authentication, etc.

CVAT is written mainly in TypeScript, React, Ant Design, CSS, Python, and Django. It is distributed under the MIT License, and its source code is available on GitHub.

CVAT team hosts an online version of the data annotation platform at cvat.ai as SaaS.

See also
 List of manual image annotation tools
 VoTT

References

External links
 Getting Started with CVAT - Annotation for Computer Vision
 Image annotation tools on GitHub
 Annotation tools for building datasets
 Best Open Source Annotation Tools for Computer Vision
 Four Important Computer Vision Annotation Tools you Need to Know in 2020
 Image Annotation Tools: Which One to Pick in 2020?

Datasets in computer vision
Object recognition and categorization